To Russell, My Brother, Whom I Slept With is the sixth comedy album by Bill Cosby and his eighth album overall. It was recorded in 1968 in the Cleveland Public Auditorium, and it was released later that year on a 12″ vinyl record.

Background
The day of the recording, Cleveland experienced a severe ice storm which tied up traffic. Cosby delayed the opening of the act for an hour to give people time to arrive and find their way to their seats. Near the end of that hour, after a period of approximately 10 minutes with no new arrivals, a woman entered and made her way to a seat very near the front row. When she had seated herself, Cosby cupped his hands around the microphone and announced in a deep, stentorian voice, "You're late!"  The entire audience erupted in laughter and the show then began.

This was Cosby's first album recorded in a large venue rather than an intimate nightclub. 

As in many of his other albums and stand-up work, Cosby delves in great detail into his childhood.  Side One covers topics such as the first sin ("The Apple") and Cosby's two daughters ("The Losers"). Side Two is one long story, recounting childhood antics in the bed that he and his brother shared when they were supposed to be asleep, which were also recounted more than 20 years later in the first chapter of his book Childhood.

It was number 1 on Spin magazine's list of the 40 Greatest Comedy Albums of All Time, calling it "stand-up comedy's masterpiece". 

Writer/director Kevin Smith said on the An Evening with Kevin Smith 2: Evening Harder DVD that this was one of his favorite comedy albums.

Track listing

Side one
Baseball  – 2:36
Conflict  – 1:18
The Losers  – 8:50
The Apple  – 1:42

Side two
To Russell, My Brother, Whom I Slept With  – 26:43

References

Bill Cosby live albums
Stand-up comedy albums
Spoken word albums by American artists
Live spoken word albums
1968 live albums
Warner Records live albums
Grammy Award for Best Comedy Album
1960s comedy albums
1960s spoken word albums